Gelson da Silva (born 4 November 1967, in Itajaí, Santa Catarina), sometimes known as just Gelson,  is a Brazilian football manager and former player. He played football for Grêmio FBPA, and scored a penalty for the club in the penalty shootout against AFC Ajax in the 1995 Intercontinental Cup in Japan.

Honours 
 Criciúma
 Campeonato Catarinense: 1989, 1990 and 1991
 Copa do Brasil: 1991

Grêmio
 Campeonato Gaúcho: 1995
 Copa Libertadores: 1995
 Brazilian Serie A: 1996

Vitória
 Campeonato Baiano: 1997

Sampaio Corrêa
 Campeonato Maranhense: 1998

References 

Living people
1967 births
Sportspeople from Santa Catarina (state)
Brazilian footballers
Brazilian football managers
Brazilian expatriate footballers
Expatriate footballers in Colombia
Campeonato Brasileiro Série A players
Campeonato Brasileiro Série B players
Campeonato Brasileiro Série B managers
Clube Náutico Marcílio Dias players
Criciúma Esporte Clube players
Grêmio Foot-Ball Porto Alegrense players
América de Cali footballers
Esporte Clube Vitória players
Sampaio Corrêa Futebol Clube players
Ceará Sporting Club players
Brusque Futebol Clube managers
Clube Náutico Marcílio Dias managers
Criciúma Esporte Clube managers
Grêmio Barueri Futebol managers
Sociedade Esportiva do Gama managers
Mogi Mirim Esporte Clube managers
Joinville Esporte Clube managers
Association football midfielders